Wang Song (born 12 October 1983) is a Chinese professional footballer who currently plays for Chinese Super League club Nantong Zhiyun.

Club career
Wang Song started his football career playing for Sichuan Quanxing in the 2001 season and would gradually establish himself as a attacking left-footed midfielder within the team until the end of the 2005 season when the club disbanded at the end of the season. This left Wang free to join second tier club Chengdu Blades where he was named as their captain. This responsibility seemed to get the best out of him and he became the top scorer in the 2007 season with seventeen goals in 24 games, helping the club secure promotion to the top tier. By the end of the 2008 league season, he had led Chengdu to thirteenth place within the league; however, the following season saw the club relegated and he left to join Hangzhou Greentown for 3 million yuan.

Hangzhou announced that the club decided not to extend Wang's contract at the end of the 2014 season. On 15 December 2014, Wang transferred to fellow Chinese Super League side Guangzhou R&F on a free transfer. On 10 February 2015, he made his debut for the club in the preliminary round of the 2015 AFC Champions League in a 3-0 win against Warriors FC. After playing a part in every CSL game in 2015 and 2016, he signed a contract extension with R&F on 25 January 2017.

On 28 February 2017, Wang transferred to Super League side Jiangsu Suning. He made his debut on 5 March 2017 in a 4–0 away defeat against Shanghai Shenhua, coming on as a substitute for Gao Tianyi in the half time. On 2 April 2017, he scored his first goal for Jiangsu in a 3–1 away defeat against Liaoning FC, which made him the first to score in 16th consecutive season of Chinese football league.

On 20 October 2019, Wang came on as a substitute in the 68th minute in a 4-1 home win over Hebei China Fortune, making him the record appearance maker in Chinese top division(including the former Jia-A League) with 416 games, surpassing previous record set by Xu Yunlong. 

On 9 March 2020, Wang joined Sichuan Jiuniu on a free transfer.  The club was in China League Two (Third division in Chinese football league system) upon his arrival, however, due to the dissolution and disqualification of numerous clubs from the top two divisions, Jiuniu eventually participated China League One for the 2020 season.

Having fallen out with Jiuniu's head coach Li Yi, Wang didn't make a single appearance for the club in the 2021 season. On 30 July 2021, Wang joined China League Two club Hebei Kungfu on loan for the remainder of the season.

On 22 January 2023, Wang joined newly promoted Super League side Nantong Zhiyun.

International career
Wang was called up by then manager Vladimir Petrović to his squad where he gave him his international debut in a 0-0 draw against Lebanon on 20 January 2008. Playing in several further friendlies, Wang was often playing as a left midfielder and was unable to make much of an impression within the team before he was dropped from the squad. After several years out of the international scene, then manager Gao Hongbo called him up to the national team and included him in the squad that took part in the 2011 AFC Asian Cup.

Wang represented Guangdong in the 39th Guangdong–Hong Kong Cup and scored the winner with a trademark free kick in the second leg at Hong Kong Stadium.

Career statistics
.

References

External links

 
Player stats at sohu.com

1983 births
Living people
Chinese footballers
Footballers from Guizhou
China international footballers
Zhejiang Professional F.C. players
Sichuan Guancheng players
Chengdu Tiancheng F.C. players
Guangzhou City F.C. players
Jiangsu F.C. players
Sichuan Jiuniu F.C. players
Chinese Super League players
China League One players
2011 AFC Asian Cup players
People from Guiyang
Association football midfielders